Capel Salem is a Grade II listed building in the hamlet of Pentre Gwynfryn, near Llanbedr, Gwynedd, Wales. This Baptist chapel building is located about a mile up river of Llanbedr, on a ridge between the two valleys. The building was begun in 1826 and completed in 1851 but ten years later, it was extended to include the chapel house and to remodel the interior.

Salem by Vosper 

The Chapel is the subject of a 1908 painting by Sidney Curnow Vosper, (b. 29 October 1866). The painting was purchased a year later by Lord Leverhulme of in 1909. At a time when many homes owned no form of visual art, Salem became widely and uniquely popular amongst working class communities, especially in Wales.

As the painting's popularity spread, so did the discussion and rumours around the notion that it contained a hidden figure, most notably that the devil was depicted in the central figure's shawl. The various interpretations of the painting, themselves became considered as examples of how people viewed rural nonconformist communities, and how the Welsh viewed  themselves.

Vosper always denied he had painted any faces into the shawl. However, the painter did confirm that he painted a ghostly face in the window above the central figure. The partial knowledge (that somewhere within the painting is a hidden face) was probably the starting point for the belief that a devil was painted into the shawl. Today, the painting and its hidden faces are often cited as an example of pareidolia. The original picture now hangs in the Lady Lever Art Gallery, Port Sunlight.

References

Llanbedr
Llanbedr, Capel Salem
Chapels in Gwynedd